Tom Weber is a Republican member of the Illinois House of Representatives for the 64th district. The district includes all or parts of Antioch, Bull Valley, Crystal Lake, Fox Lake, Lake Villa, Lakemoor, Volo, and Woodstock.

Weber, a former Lake County Board member, defeated Democratic candidate Trisha Zubert in the 2018 general election.

As of July 3, 2022, Representative Weber is a member of the following committees:

 Appropriations - General Service Committee (HAPG)
 Counties & Townships Committee (HCOT)
 Ethics & Elections Committee (SHEE)
 Health Care Availability & Access Committee (HHCA)
 Human Services Committee (HHSV)
 Public Benefits Subcommittee (HHSV-PUBX)

Electoral history

References

External links
Representative  Tom Weber (R) 64th District at the Illinois General Assembly
By Session: 101st
 Tom Weber for State Representative official campaign site

Year of birth missing (living people)
21st-century American politicians
Democratic Party members of the Illinois House of Representatives
People from Lake Villa, Illinois
Living people